The Levine Museum of the New South, is a history museum located in Charlotte, North Carolina whose exhibits focus on life in the North Carolina Piedmont after the American Civil War. The museum includes temporary and permanent exhibits on a range of Southern-related topics. Founded in 1991 as the Museum of the New South, it was renamed after museum patron and Family Dollar founder Leon Levine in 2001, also the year the current facility at 7th and College Streets downtown opened.

Overview
The museum's permanent exhibit is called "Cotton Fields to Skyscrapers: Charlotte and the Carolina Piedmont in the New South", and features period displays that reflect regional history.  The displays include a one-room tenant farmer's house, a cotton mill and mill house, an African-American hospital, an early Belk department store, and a civil-rights era lunch counter.  Changing exhibits focus on local culture, art and history.

In March 2013, the Charlotte Museum of History announced plans to move its administrative offices to the Levine Museum.

In 2019, the museum had an exhibit "The Legacy of Lynching: Confronting Racial Terror in America", prepared in collaboration with the Equal Justice Initiative, who created the National Memorial for Peace and Justice.

Relocation was considered in 2020 because the site had no room for expansion and was worth $7.7 million according to county records. The COVID-19 pandemic was one reason for considering more virtual options. On June 16, 2021, the museum announced it would sell the downtown location and look for a new home. This news comes as the museum adds virtual activities such as the digital walking tour starting in August 2021. These changes come with the help of a $600,000 grant from the John S. and James L. Knight Foundation.

In March 2022, the museum announced the sale of its building for $10.75 million to Vela Uptown LLC, which planned a high-rise apartment building. The museum closed in May to prepare for the move. On June 16, 2022, the museum announced it would reopen in Fall 2022 in 6000 square feet in the Levine Center for the Arts at Three Wells Fargo Center, in space donated by Wells Fargo.

Gallery

References

External links 
 Levine Museum of the New South – official site

Museums in Charlotte, North Carolina
History museums in North Carolina